Morocco competed at the 2022 World Games held in Birmingham, United States from 7 to 17 July 2022. Athletes representing Morocco won four silver medals. The country finished in 52nd place in the medal table.

Medalists

Competitors
The following is the list of number of competitors in the Games.

Boules sports

Morocco competed in boules sports.

Duathlon

Morocco competed in duathlon.

Ju-jitsu

Morocco won one silver medal in ju-jitsu.

Karate

Morocco won one silver medal in karate.

Men

Muaythai

Morocco won two silver medals in muaythai.

Water skiing

Kamil Belmrah was registered to compete in water skiing; he did not start in his event.

References

Nations at the 2022 World Games
2022
World Games